Colonel Paul Baker Jr. (10 February 1921 – 8 May 2011) was a United States Air Force pilot, nuclear physicist, and lifelong student of the saxophone. Dr. Baker was born to Muriel Holbrook Baker and Paul Baker Sr. of Ashland, Kentucky. Valedictorian of the graduating class of 1942 from Washington and Lee University, his accomplishments included receiving a Bachelor of Science and memberships in Phi Beta Kappa, Phi Eta Sigma, Beta Theta Pi and various dance bands.

Dr. Baker received another Bachelor of Science from the United States Military Academy at West Point in 1945 and was a member of the 1st Battalion, Company B. Also in 1945, he was commissioned as 2nd Lt., Army Air Corps. Over the course of his military career, Dr. Baker's tours of duty included Furstenfeldbruch, Germany; Williams AFB, AS; Keesler AFB, MS; Pentagon, VA; C.A.N.A.L., CT; ASAFA, CO; Nuclear Regulatory Commission, MD.

In 1948, while serving in the Army, in Furstenfeldbruch, he married Vera Iantha Dunton of Miami, Florida; while she was serving in the Red Cross. After the war, the Bakers returned to the United States where Dr. Baker received a Master of Science in Nuclear Engineering from North Carolina State University in 1952. Dr. Baker received his Ph.D. in nuclear physics from the University of Denver in 1965. As a member of the faculty of the United States Air Force Academy, Dr. Baker served as professor, as well as Chair of the Physics Department and as a member of the Selections Committee. He served as an active United States Air Force pilot until his retirement from the service in 1975. He retired from the Nuclear Regulatory Commission in 1985 and was included in Who's Who in America.

Upon his retirement, Dr. Baker spent his free time playing the saxophone in four Fairfax County musical ensembles, ranging from orchestras to quartets. In addition to gardening, Dr. Baker enjoyed swimming and tennis. He was a member of Little River United Church of Christ in Annandale, Virginia for over 40 years, serving as a trustee and on Special Gifts Committee. He and Iantha spent over 20 summer vacations at Bethany Beach, Delaware with their children, grandchildren and extended family. In addition to his wife, Iantha, Dr. Baker is survived by his four children: Dr. Paul Mark Baker, Miriam Anne Baker Hatcher of Richmond, Jon Clark Baker, and Bup Thi Dang Phillippi.

References 

1921 births
2011 deaths
United States Air Force airmen
American nuclear physicists
People from Ashland, Kentucky
Washington and Lee University alumni
United States Military Academy alumni
North Carolina State University alumni
University of Denver alumni
American expatriates in Germany